The Yale Review of Law and Social Action was a student-edited quarterly that was published by Yale University from 1970 to 1973. Hillary Rodham served on its Board of Editors and was an associate editor while attending Yale Law School.

References

American law journals
Quarterly magazines published in the United States
Student magazines published in the United States
Defunct magazines published in the United States
Magazines established in 1970
Magazines disestablished in 1973
Magazines published in Connecticut
Social law
Yale Law School
Mass media in New Haven, Connecticut